Tân Phước Khánh is a ward of Tân Uyên town in Bình Dương Province, Vietnam.

References

Populated places in Bình Dương province